The 1977 Tulane Green Wave football team was an American football team that represented Tulane University during the 1977 NCAA Division I football season as an independent. In their second year under head coach Larry Smith, the team compiled a 3–8 record.

Schedule

Roster

References

Tulane
Tulane Green Wave football seasons
Tulane Green Wave football